Dresden 45 was a hardcore punk and crossover thrash band from Houston, Texas, also known as D'45 and variantly, D45.  They were one of the first hardcore bands to implement a guitar-driven heavy metal sound into their music.  Like other Houston bands Dirty Rotten Imbeciles and Verbal Abuse, Dresden 45 played a breathless, high-speed type of hardcore punk now referred to as thrashcore.

History
Formed in 1985 or 86.  Last release dated 1993, though last live performance was in 1989.

Members
 Brumby Boylston - vocals
 Patrick Godbey - guitar
 Uncle Charlie Hardwick - bass, vocals
 Oscar T. Gray - drums
 Scott Daniels - bass

Discography

Releases
 Liberators 7"
 Swiss Bank Account 7"
 Paradise Lost LP
 Blooddump 7"
 Double Against 7"
 Paradise Lost (expanded) - CD Reissue - Arclight Records

Compilations
 Attack Is Now Suicide
 Houston Loud
 Axiom Live

Hardcore punk groups from Texas
Crossover thrash groups
Musical groups from Houston